The Assassin (or: The Assassin Niè Yǐnniáng) is a 2015 wuxia film directed by Taiwanese director Hou Hsiao-hsien. A Taiwan/China/Hong Kong co-production, it was an official selection in the main competition section at the 2015 Cannes Film Festival. At Cannes, Hou won the award for Best Director. It was released in China and Hong Kong on 27 August, and a day later in Taiwan on 28 August 2015. It was selected as the Taiwanese entry for the Best Foreign Language Film at the 88th Academy Awards but it was not nominated. The international film magazine Sight & Sound named it the best film of 2015.

Plot
The Assassin is loosely based on the late seventh-century martial arts story "Nie Yinniang" by Pei Xing, a core text in Chinese swordsmanship and wuxia fiction.

The film is set in seventh-century China during the last years of the Tang Dynasty following the Lushan Rebellion. The circuit of Weibo, though nominally a part of the Tang Empire, is de facto ruled independently by military governor Tian Ji'an. The film centers on Nie Yinniang (played by Shu Qi), an assassin who is directed to slay corrupt government officials by her master, Jiaxin, a nun who raised her from the age of ten. When Yinniang displays mercy by failing to kill during her duties, Jiaxin punishes her with a ruthless assignment designed to test Yinniang's resolve: she is sent to the distant province/circuit of Weibo in northern China to kill its military governor, her cousin Tian Ji'an, to whom she was betrothed as a child.

As Princess Jiacheng recounts to her when she arrives, the betrothal was a consequence of Jiacheng's own marriage. Jiacheng was married off an official of Weibo to quell unrest in Weibo, whereupon she adopted her husband's son, Tian Ji'an as her own. At her request, Tian Ji'an was betrothed to Yinniang at the age of fifteen. However, the betrothal was canceled in favor of a politically pressing marriage, and Yinniang was sent off to live with Princess Jiacheng's sister the nun Jiaxin. Yinniang wrestles with her mission to kill Tian Ji'an for much of the film.

When Yinniang's uncle Tian Xing expresses views Tian Ji'an finds offensive in a meeting of state, Tian Ji'an demotes Tian Xing and sends him away to Linqing under the protection of Nie Feng, Yinniang's father. They are soon ambushed, but Yinniang arrives in time to rescue them. She accompanies the wounded survivors to a village where they meet a young mirror-polisher.

Eventually, Yinniang concludes that killing Tian Ji'an while his sons are young would plunge Weibo into chaos and instead protects him on the journey where she was supposed to kill him. The film concludes with Yinniang leaving behind the strictures of Jiaxin and the high politics of Weibo, instead joining the young mirror-polisher on a journey as his guardian.

Cast
Shu Qi as Nie Yinniang, the eponymous assassin
Chang Chen as Tian Ji'an, cousin to Nie Yinniang, formerly betrothed to her, and military governor (Jiedushi), ruling Weibo Circuit.
Zhou Yun as Lady Tian, Tian Ji'an's wife.
Satoshi Tsumabuki as the mirror polisher
Ethan Juan as Xia Jing, Tian Ji'an's bodyguard
Hsieh Hsin-Ying as Huji, Tian Ji'an's concubine and a dancer 
Ni Dahong as Nie Feng, Nie Yinniang's father and Tian Ji'an's provost 
Yong Mei as Lady Nie Tian, Nie Yinniang's mother
Fang-Yi Sheu as Princess Jiacheng and her twin sister, the princess Jiaxin turned Taoist nun
Lei Zhenyu as Tian Xing
Jacques Picoux as Kong Kong

Production

The film received several subsidies from the Taiwanese government: in 2005 of NT$15 million (US$501,000), in 2008 of NT$80 million (US$2.67 million) and in 2010 of NT$20 million (US$668,000). However, over the production, Hou encountered various budget problems; thus more than half of the film's final budget came from China, a first for Hou. As of September 2012, its budget was CN¥90 million (US$14.9 million).

The film was filmed in several places in China, mainly in Hubei province, Inner Mongolia and north-eastern China. Hou recalled that he was "blown away" when he saw "those silver birch forests and lakes: it was like being transported into a Chinese classical painting."

Release
The first press conference of The Assassin since its Cannes premiere was held in Shanghai on 16 June 2015, where Hou and the film's cast discussed their Cannes experience and their upcoming promotional activities for the film.

The film premiered in Beijing on 23 August 2015, ahead of its nationwide release on 27 August 2015. For its American release, the film's distribution rights were acquired by independent distribution company Well Go USA Entertainment on 11 May 2015, and the film was released on 16 October 2015.

Home media
The Assassin was released on Blu-ray and DVD in Hong Kong on 20 December 2015. The North American release was 26 January 2016 and included four behind-the-scenes featurettes regarding the film.

Reception

Box office
The film earned  at the Chinese box office. Worldwide box office is around U.S. $12 million.

Critical response

The Assassin opened to critical acclaim. On review aggregator website Rotten Tomatoes, the film holds an 80% "Certified Fresh" rating, based on 102 reviews, with an average rating of 7.5/10. The site's consensus states: "The Assassins thrilling visuals mark a fresh highlight for director Hsiao-hsien Hou, even if its glacial pace may keep some viewers at arm's length." Metacritic reports an 81 out of 100 rating, based on 29 critics, indicating "universal acclaim". Sight & Sound magazine ranked The Assassin as the best film of 2015 based on a poll of 168 critics from around the world. The Online Film Critics Society called the film the best foreign language film of 2015.
It also ranked 50th in a 2016 BBC poll of the 21st century's greatest films.

New York Times co-chief film critic Manohla Dargis called the film "staggeringly lovely" at Cannes, describing it as having "held the Wednesday-night audience in rapturous silence until the closing credits, when thunderous applause and booming bravos swept through the auditorium like a wave". Variety'''s chief film critic Justin Chang highly praises the film, saying "The sheer depth of its formal artistry places The Assassin in a rather more rarefied realm.... Hou implicitly grasps the expressive power of stillness and reserve, the ways in which silence can build tension and heighten interest. Above all, he never loses sight of the fact that the bodies he moves so fluidly and intuitively through space are human, and remain so even in death. ... Hou Hsiao-hsien proves himself to be not just the creator of this assassin but an unmistakably kindred spirit." On Film Business Asia, Derek Elley gave it a 9 out of 10, saying that "Hou Hsiao-hsien's first wuxia masterfully blends the genre's essence and his own style". Deborah Young of The Hollywood Reporter said: "Hou Hsiao-hsien brings a pure, idiosyncratic vision to the martial arts genre". Ignatiy Vishnevetsky of The A.V. Club describes the "enigmatic and often mesmerizing" Assassin as "one of the most flat-out beautiful movies of the last decade, and also one of the most puzzling". He states, "Mood is key here...[the film is] all muted and subsumed by a poetic atmosphere that's radical even by Hou's standards...It's a movie most will be intoxicated by, but few will be able to confidently say that they understand—which may be the point, part and parcel with its conception of a world of gestures and values so absolute as to be nearly unknowable."

John Esther of UR Chicago gave the film a more mixed review, saying "the real strength (and strain) of The Assassin is the mise-en-scène by Hou and director of photographer Mark Lee Ping Bing (In the Mood for Love; Renoir)" but criticized the film's glossy depiction of the environment, "The costumes, the people, the woods, the art, and the interiors are relentlessly pretty. Other than human nature, The Assassin suggests there was nothing ugly to witness during this period in time."

Sarah Cronin of the British magazine Electric Sheep writes "The intricacies of the story are bewildering, with the 'who' and the 'why' only obliquely revealed as the film lingers on. But rather than lending The Assassin an air of intrigue, these mysteries seem pointlessly and frustratingly obtuse, with the most potent symbolism left to be teased out of a broken piece of jade, while not enough is done to bring the characters to life, to make them whole. Hou Hsiao-hsien deliberately avoids giving its audience any of the pleasures of wuxia, but its take on the genre offers little, and feels like a pale shadow of fellow auteur Wong Kar Wai's Ashes of Time.  It looks gorgeous, but there's a shallowness to its beauty. The Assassin'', unfortunately, is more still life than cinema."

Accolades

See also
List of submissions to the 88th Academy Awards for Best Foreign Language Film
List of Taiwanese submissions for the Academy Award for Best Foreign Language Film

References

External links
 
Well Go USA official site

2015 films
2015 martial arts films
2010s Mandarin-language films
Taiwanese martial arts films
Chinese martial arts films
Hong Kong martial arts films
Asian Film Award for Best Film winners
Best Feature Film Golden Horse Award winners
Films based on short fiction
Films directed by Hou Hsiao-hsien
Films set in 9th-century Tang dynasty
Films shot in Hubei
Films shot in Inner Mongolia
Wuxia films
Central Motion Picture Corporation films
Films with screenplays by Chu T’ien-wen
Films with screenplays by Ah Cheng
2010s Hong Kong films